Rumpole's Last Case is a 1987 collection of short stories by John Mortimer about defence barrister Horace Rumpole. They were adapted from his scripts for the TV series of the same name.
The stories were:
"Rumpole and the Winter Break"
"Rumpole and the Blind Tasting"  
"Rumpole and the Bright Seraphim"
"Rumpole and the Judge's Elbow" 
"Rumpole and the Official Secret" 
"Rumpole and the Old, Old Story" 
"Rumpole's Last Case"

References

Works by John Mortimer
1987 short story collections